John T. Yudichak (born May 1, 1970) is an American politician from the Commonwealth of Pennsylvania who served as a member of the Pennsylvania State Senate for 14th District from 2011 to 2022. He previously served in the Pennsylvania House of Representatives for the 119th district from 1999 to 2010.

Early life and education
John Yudichak was born on May 1, 1970 in Wilkes-Barre, Pennsylvania, to Joseph and Sarah Yudichak. Both Yudichak's father and grandfather were coal miners. He graduated from Nanticoke Area High School in 1988, and attended Wyoming Seminary for one year before transferring to the Pennsylvania State University.  He earned a Bachelor of Arts degree in English in 1993 and a Master of Arts degree in American Studies from Pennsylvania State University in 2004.

Career
Yudichak worked as an intern for U.S. Representative Paul E. Kanjorski before serving as director of development at the Osterhout Free Library in Wilkes-Barre. In 1996, he unsuccessfully challenged incumbent Stanley Jarolin for the Democratic nomination for the 119th District in the Pennsylvania House of Representatives, losing by 600 votes. However, he ran for the nomination again in 1998, and defeated Jarolin by more than 800 votes. In the general election, he defeated Republican Jean Sepling.

Yudichak was elected to the State Senate in 2010. He easily won the Democratic nomination for the 14th District seat (being vacated by Democratic incumbent Ray Musto) when he defeated Wilkes-Barre mayor Tom Leighton by a 2 to 1 margin in the May 18, 2010 primary. Yudichak won the general election on November 2, 2010, defeating Luzerne County Commissioner Stephen Urban.

On November 19, 2019, Yudichak changed his voter registration from Democrat to Independent, and ceased to caucus with the Democrats, caucusing instead with the Republican majority. He blamed his party switch on "purist" partisan politicians "who demand that you choose a battle camp. You must pass their litmus test, and declare if you support ‘us,’ or ‘them.’" Yudichak would later say that Democrats' support for environmental activists who opposed the expansion of Pennsylvania's energy industry caused friction between him and the party.

On March 17, 2022, Yudichak announced he would not seek re-election, after the redistricting process shifted his district to the Lehigh Valley and placed his home in the 20th Senate District.

References

External links
 Pennsylvania Senate - John Yudichak (Democrat) official PA Senate website
 Pennsylvania Senate Democratic Caucus - John Yudichak official Party website

1970 births
Living people
Politicians from Wilkes-Barre, Pennsylvania
Pennsylvania state senators
Pennsylvania Democrats
Pennsylvania Independents
Pennsylvania State University alumni
21st-century American politicians
Wyoming Seminary alumni
Democratic Party members of the Pennsylvania House of Representatives
Democratic Party Pennsylvania state senators